Thiago Quirino da Silva or simply Quirino (born 4 January 1985 in Belo Horizonte) is a Brazilian football striker, who plays for Malaysian side  Felda United.

Career
From 2003 to 2005, he played for Atlético Mineiro. On signing for Djurgårdens IF before the 2006 season, the club made it clear to media and competing clubs that they had found themselves their very own "golden boy". However, Thiago's impact at Stockholms Stadion was far from impressive and during the 2006 season, he scored only one goal and was regularly used as a substitute, if at all being part of the match squad. While this may be true, it is clear to see that the transfer from the Brazilian way of futbol to the Swedish football way took its toll on his game. Quirino did score in the derby against AIK on 24 September, making it 1–0 to his side.

On 21 November 2008 it was revealed that Quirino had officially been transferred to the newly relegated J. League team Consadole Sapporo. The reported transfer sum was 2,5 million SEK, far less than the 14 million SEK it was reported that Djurgården themselves spent 3 years earlier.

On 17 January 2011, Daegu FC was officially announced his signing of a 1-year loan contract.
on 23 January 2012, he loaned back to Consadole Sapporo.

Career statistics
Updated to 23 February 2018.

References

External links
Profile at Kagoshima United FC
Player profile at dif.se
Stats Centre: Thiago Quirino da SilvaFacts

1985 births
Living people
Clube Atlético Mineiro players
Djurgårdens IF Fotboll players
Daegu FC players
Hokkaido Consadole Sapporo players
Shonan Bellmare players
Ventforet Kofu players
Oita Trinita players
Kagoshima United FC players
Al-Shaab CSC players
Allsvenskan players
J1 League players
J2 League players
J3 League players
K League 1 players
Expatriate footballers in Sweden
Expatriate footballers in Japan
Expatriate footballers in South Korea
Expatriate footballers in the United Arab Emirates
Brazilian footballers
Brazil under-20 international footballers
Brazilian expatriate footballers
Brazilian expatriate sportspeople in Sweden
Brazilian expatriate sportspeople in Japan
Brazilian expatriate sportspeople in South Korea
Brazilian expatriate sportspeople in the United Arab Emirates
Association football forwards
UAE Pro League players
Footballers from Belo Horizonte